This is a list of electoral results for the electoral district of Walhalla in Victorian state elections.

Members for Walhalla

Election results

Elections in the 1940s

Elections in the 1930s

|- style="background-color:#E9E9E9"
! colspan="6" style="text-align:left;" |After distribution of preferences

 Preferences were not distributed to completion.

 Two party preferred vote was estimated.

Elections in the 1920s

Elections in the 1910s

References

Victoria (Australia) state electoral results by district